What They Had is a 2018 American drama film written and directed by Elizabeth Chomko (in her feature directorial debut) and starring Hilary Swank, Michael Shannon, Robert Forster, Blythe Danner, Taissa Farmiga, and Josh Lucas.

The film had its world premiere at the Sundance Film Festival on January 21, 2018, and was released in the United States on October 19, 2018 by Bleecker Street.

Plot
When her Alzheimer's-suffering mother, Ruth, wanders into a blizzard on Christmas Eve, Bridget Ertz travels back to her hometown to help her brother, Nicky, convince their father to put Ruth in a nursing home and face the end of their lifelong love affair.

Ruth returns to her home with her family and discussions ensue about her future. Nicky debates with their father, Norbert as he has secured a spot in one of the premiere memory assisted facilities in Chicago. Yet Norbert insists that he alone can provide the best care for Ruth. Nicky looks to Bridget for help, but her time away from her parents makes this a challenge to address. Bridget is dealing with her own immediate family issues as she's never connected with her husband and her daughter, suffering from anxiety, has stopped attending classes at college.

Nicky continues to argue with his father over Ruth's future and after a heated discussion he leaves the home. Bridget discusses her father's interference in her life and just then they notice that Ruth has again disappeared from the home. She is discovered quickly, but Norbert finally realizes that Ruth must go to the assisted care facility.

Norbert reconciles with his son by visiting his tavern. Shortly thereafter he dies due to a heart attack and Nicky is grief-stricken. Bridget spends time with her mother at her assisted home and sees how well they are treating her. She leaves the facility with a restful smile on her face.

Cast
 Hilary Swank as Bridget "Bitty" Ertz
 Michael Shannon as Nicholas "Nicky" Everhardt
 Robert Forster as Norbert Everhardt
 Blythe Danner as Ruth Everhardt (née O'Shea)
 Taissa Farmiga as Emma Ertz
 Josh Lucas as Eddie Ertz
 Sarah Sutherland as Mary
 Aimee Garcia as Dr. Zoe
 Jay Montepare as David
 Jennifer Robideau as Rachel

Production

Development
In 2014, Elizabeth Chomko was selected for the Sundance Institute's Screenwriters Lab with a script for the drama film What They Had. In September 2015, Chomko's script was announced as a winner for the Nicholl Fellowships in Screenwriting. In June 2016, Chomko revealed she would also direct the film from her screenplay. Albert Berger and Ron Yerxa were later reported to produce for Bona Fide Productions, along with Bill Holderman, and Andrew Duncan and Alex Saks producing for June Pictures, and Keith Kjarval producing for Unified Pictures.

Casting
On March 17, 2017, it was reported that Hilary Swank, Michael Shannon, Robert Forster, Blythe Danner, and Taissa Farmiga had been cast in the film. Sarah Sutherland's casting was confirmed in August 2017.

Filming
Principal photography began on March 22, 2017 in Chicago, Illinois. On March 28, members of the Amboy American Legion performed a graveside service for a scene in the film on location in Westchester, Illinois. Conboy Westchester Funeral Home also hosted the cast and crew for filming on March 28. Production was set up in Hyde Park, Chicago for more than two weeks, concluding on April 17. Filming wrapped in Los Angeles on May 2, 2017.

Music
In December 2017, it was reported that Danny Mulhern would compose the film's score.

The end credit song "Are You There" is written by Aoife O'Donovan, the film's writer and director Elizabeth Chomko and her mother Kate Chomko.

Release
In May 2017, Bleecker Street acquired domestic distribution rights to the film. It had its world premiere at the Sundance Film Festival on January 21, 2018. What They Had was initially scheduled for release on March 16, 2018, but was pushed back to October 19, 2018.

Reception
The website's critical consensus reads, "What They Had finds laughter and tears in its portrait of a family at a crossroads, with writer-director Elizabeth Chomko getting outstanding performances out of a talented cast." Metacritic assigned the film a weighted average score of 69 out of 100, based on 25 critics, indicating "generally favorable reviews".

Accolades

References

External links
 
 
 
 

2018 drama films
American drama films
Bleecker Street films
2018 directorial debut films
2018 independent films
Films about Alzheimer's disease
Films set in Chicago
Films shot in Chicago
Films shot in Los Angeles
2010s English-language films
2010s American films